Frank Wayne Marsh (born June 19, 1940 in La Grande, Oregon), is a former professional American football defensive back in the American Football League for the San Diego Chargers. He competed in track at Oregon State University.

Early years
Marsh attended Wallowa High School, where he practiced track and football. He played as a halfback in football.

He accepted a track scholarship from Oregon State, where he ran in the sprint medley relay and the high hurdles.

Professional career

Dallas Cowboys
On June 27, 1963, he was signed as an undrafted free agent by the Dallas Cowboys to be tried at offensive end, although he didn't play college football. He was released before the season started on July 18.

Detroit Lions
In 1966, he was signed as a free agent by the Detroit Lions to play defensive back. He was cut on August 25 and later signed to the practice squad. He was released on September 5, 1967.

San Diego Chargers
In 1967, he was signed by the San Diego Chargers of the American Football League. He played as a defensive back.

Cincinnati Bengals
In the 1968 AFL expansion draft, he was left unprotected by the Chargers and was selected by the Cincinnati Bengals. At training camp he was also tried at running back. He was released on June 28, 1969.

Personal life
His brother Amos Marsh played professional football for the Dallas Cowboys and Detroit Lions.

References

1940 births
Living people
People from La Grande, Oregon
Players of American football from Oregon
American football defensive backs
Oregon State Beavers men's track and field athletes
Detroit Lions players
San Diego Chargers players
Cincinnati Bengals players
American Football League players